Wang Juan (born 1982-03-05 in Suzhou, Jiangsu) is a female Chinese judoka who competed in the 2008 Summer Olympics in the Middleweight (63–70 kg) event.

Major performances
2001/2005 National Games - 2nd/1st -70 kg class;
2007 National Championships - 1st -70 kg class;
2007 World Team Championships - 1st;
2008 World Cup Budapest - 3rd -70 kg class

See also
China at the 2008 Summer Olympics

References
http://2008teamchina.olympic.cn/index.php/personview/personsen/2768

1982 births
Living people
Judoka at the 2008 Summer Olympics
Olympic judoka of China
Sportspeople from Suzhou
Chinese female judoka
20th-century Chinese women
21st-century Chinese women